Novosyolovo is a rural locality (a village) in Kiprevskoye Rural Settlement, Kirzhachsky District, Vladimir Oblast, Russia. The population was 643 as of 2010.

Yuri Gagarin, the first person to orbit the Earth, died in a plane crash near Novosyolovo in 1968.

Geography 
Novosyolovo is located 18 km southeast of Kirzhach (the district's administrative centre) by road. Bukhlovo is the nearest rural locality.

References 

Rural localities in Kirzhachsky District
Pokrovsky Uyezd